Pavol Jablonicky is a Slovakia  International Federation of BodyBuilders professional bodybuilder.

Competitive stats
Height: 5'8 Born: January 24, 1961

Contest history
1987 European Amateur Championships, Light-Heavyweight, 1st
1987 World Amateur Championships, Light-Heavyweight, 1st
1988 World Amateur Championships, HeavyWeight, 1st
1989 Grand Prix Holland, 12th
1989 Mr. Olympia, 16th
1990 Grand Prix Germany, 5th
1990 Grand Prix Holland, 3rd
1990 Ironman Pro Invitational, 9th
1991 Mr. Olympia, Did not place
1992 Night of Champions, 9th
1993 Grand Prix Germany (2), 7th
1993 Grand Prix Germany, 5th
1993 Night of Champions, 9th
1994 Arnold Classic, 12th
1994 Grand Prix Germany (2), 11th
1995 Grand Prix Ukraine, 9th
1995 Niagara Falls Pro Invitational, 2nd
1995 Mr. Olympia, 16th
1996 Night of Champions, 8th
1997 Night of Champions, 5th
1998 Night of Champions, 14th
1999 Night of Champions, 2nd
1999 Mr. Olympia, 14th
1999 Toronto Pro Invitational, 1st
2000 Night of Champions, 6th
2001 Night of Champions, 4th
2001 Mr. Olympia, *19th
2003 Grand Prix Hungary, 1st
2003 Night of Champions, 2nd
2004 Hungarian Pro Invitational, 1st
2004 Night of Champions, 5th
2004 Mr. Olympia, 11th
2004 Toronto Pro Invitational, 4th
2005 Europa Supershow, 7th
2006 Masters Pro World, 3rd
2006 New York Pro Championships, 10th

See also
List of male professional bodybuilders
List of female professional bodybuilders

References 

Professional bodybuilders
1963 births
Living people